Clear Lake City STOLport  was owned by Houston Metro Airlines, a commuter air carrier. It was located adjacent to Clear Lake City on Texas State Highway 3 (also known as the Old Galveston Highway) approximately two miles west of the NASA Johnson Space Center just southeast  of Ellington Air Force Base (now Ellington Field).

The compact airfield featured a single paved northwest–southeast 2,500 foot runway, with a ramp, maintenance hangar and terminal building on the southeast side.  Houston Metro's  primary route was between the CLC STOLport and Houston Intercontinental Airport.  Several other airports in southeast Texas were served as well.

According to the February 1, 1970 Houston Metro timetable, the airline was operating twenty-four (24) round trip flights on weekdays between the CLC STOLport and Houston Intercontinental on a high frequency shuttle schedule with flights departing every 30 minutes during certain periods of the day.

The STOLport was constructed and initially operated by Houston Metro Airlines which flew de Havilland Canada DHC-6 Twin Otter twin engine turboprop commuter aircraft  featuring STOL (Short Take Off and Landing) performance.  Houston Metro then changed its name to Metro Airlines and subsequently ceased serving the CLC STOLport with service then being provided by Royale Airlines which also operated Twin Otter flights to Houston Intercontinental before ceasing all service and going out of business.  The STOLport was then abandoned with the land being redeveloped for other purposes.

References

Airports in Houston
Defunct airports in Texas